Denys Sadovyi (born 31 August 1995 Chernihiv) is a Ukrainian professional footballer who last played as a midfielder for FC Chernihiv in the Ukrainian Second League.

Career
In 2012 he started his youth career with Yunist Chernihiv.

FC Chernihiv
In 2017, Sadovyi moved to FC Chernihiv, just promoted to the Ukrainian Second League. On 24 October 2020, he made his debut with his new team against Karpaty Lviv for the 2020–21 Ukrainian Second League. On 21 June 2021 his contract with FC Chernihiv was ended.

Career statistics

Club

References

External links
 on Official website of FC Chernihiv
 Profile on Official website of Ukrainian Second League
 

1995 births
Living people
Footballers from Chernihiv
Association football defenders
FC Yunist Chernihiv players
FC Chernihiv players
Ukrainian footballers
Ukrainian Second League players